Middletown Historic District is a national historic district located at Middletown, Frederick County, Virginia. It encompasses 234 contributing buildings in the town of Middletown. The majority of the buildings are residential and their associated outbuildings.  The non-residential historic structures include four specialty shops, a theater, four churches, the Town Hall, two former schools, three warehouses and an inn.  Notable buildings include Middletown Mission Church (c. 1872), Grace United Methodist Church (1897), Mt. Zion Church (1880), the former Middletown School (1909), the Town Hall (1880), The Wayside Inn, Larrick's Tavern, Wayside Theatre (1946), and Lafolette House (c. 1800). Located in the district and separately listed is the St. Thomas Chapel.

It was listed on the National Register of Historic Places in 2003.

References

External links

Historic districts on the National Register of Historic Places in Virginia
Buildings and structures in Frederick County, Virginia
National Register of Historic Places in Frederick County, Virginia